Hugh L. Nevill (1847 – 1897) was a British civil servant, best known for his scholarship and studies of the culture of Sri Lanka.

Biography
Hugh Nevill was born on 19 June 1847, and came to Ceylon, as it was then called, at the age of seventeen as Private Secretary to the Chief Justice. Subsequently, he was a Writer in the Ceylon Civil Service, 1869; Commissioner of Requests, Colombo, 1879; District Judge, Matara, 1885; Fiscal for the Central Province, 1886; Assistant to the Government Agent, Trincomalee, 1891 and District Judge, Batticaloa from 1895 to 1897. He died at Hyères in France on 10 April 1897.

Hugh Nevill had a younger brother named Geoffrey, who was a malacologist and a malacological author who worked in the Indian Museum, in Kolkata.

Scholarly contributions
Nevill was a pioneer student of the origin and development of Sinhala, the main language of Sri Lanka, and of the dialects of the Veddhas, Rodiyas, and Vanniyas. He was the founder and a major contributor of the scholarly journal The Taprobanian, and of the Kandyan Society of Arts.  His interests and publications were extremely broad, covering anthropology, archaeology, botany, ethnology, folklore, geography, geology, history, mythology, palaeography, philology, and zoology.

Hugh Nevill shared an interest in malacology with his younger brother Geoffrey; together they worked on researching the mollusks of India. Like his brother, Hugh also had a scientific collection.

The Hugh Nevill Collections
During his 32 years in Sri Lanka, Nevill assembled a collection of 2,227 prose and verse manuscripts, mostly in Sinhala, Malayalam, Tamil, and Pali, now kept at the British Library. He produced a critical catalogue of the collection, in two volumes, but died before it was published. A more detailed description, in seven volumes, was eventually prepared by K. D. Somadasa and was published by the Library.

One of these manuscripts is the Sri Lanka Portuguese Creole Manuscript, the earliest text of significant length in the Indo-Portuguese creole spoken by the Burghers and Kaffirs communities of Sri Lanka.

Many objects collected by Nevill in Sri Lanka were acquired by the British Museum in 1898.

Books
K. D. Somadasa, Catalogue of the Hugh Nevill Collection, 7 vols. London, British Library Press and the Pali Text Society.
Hugh Nevill, Sinhala Kavi ("Sinhalese Verse"). Edited by P. E. P. Deraniyagala.

References

External links
British Museum collections online
British Library

British expatriate academics in Sri Lanka
1847 births
1897 deaths